Pooja Hegde (born 13 October 1990) is an Indian actress who appears in Telugu, Hindi and Tamil films. She began her career as a model and was crowned as the second runner-up at the 2010 I Am She–Miss Universe India pageant. She made her acting debut with the Tamil film Mugamoodi (2012) and had her first Telugu release in Oka Laila Kosam (2014). Hegde established herself as one of the leading actresses in Telugu cinema.

Hegde won the SIIMA Award for Best Actress – Telugu for her performance in Ala Vaikunthapurramuloo (2020) and was nominated for the Filmfare Award for Best Actress – Telugu for Oka Laila Kosam and Aravinda Sametha Veera Raghava (2018). Her other commercially successful films include Duvvada Jagannadham (2017), Maharshi (2019), Gaddalakonda Ganesh (2019), Housefull 4 (2019), and Most Eligible Bachelor (2021). Her four film releases of 2022, Beast, Radhe Shyam, Cirkus and Acharya, were poorly received namely which impeded her career.

Early life 
Pooja Hegde was born and brought up in Mumbai, Maharashtra in a Tulu-speaking family. Her parents are Manjunath Hegde and Latha Hegde. They are originally from Udupi, Karnataka. She also has an elder brother Rishabh Hegde, who is an orthopaedic surgeon. Besides Tulu, she is fluent in Kannada, English, Hindi and Marathi. She later learnt Telugu and Tamil following a career in her respective cinema. She did her schooling in Maneckji Cooper Education Trust School, Mumbai. She went to M. M. K. College, where she regularly participated in dance and fashion shows.

Hegde competed in the Miss India 2009 competition, but was eliminated in an early round despite winning the Miss India Talented 2009 honour. She re-applied the following year and was the second runner-up in the Miss Universe India 2010 competition, while also being crowned Miss India South Glamorous Hair 2010 in the subsidiary competition.

Career

Early work (2012–2017) 

Hegde made her acting debut in Mysskin's Tamil superhero film Mugamoodi (2012) opposite Jiiva, portraying the female lead character of Shakthi, a fun-loving girl who inspires the male lead to change his outlook on society. She was selected after Mysskin had seen still photographs from her pageant success, and Hegde helped practice Tamil dialogue for the film by writing and memorising words in English, adding that the similarity between Tamil and her native tongue Tulu was also useful. Prior to release, the film garnered high expectations as a result of the novel theme of a superhero in Tamil films and the film took a grand opening at the box office in August 2012. Times of India stated that "Pooja Hegde though has little to do and comes across as just another pretty face." NDTV wrote "Pooja Hegde, the debutante may have floored everyone with her amiable appearance, but she definitely needs some coaching in expressions." She earned a nomination for the Best Tamil Female Debut Actress at the 2nd South Indian International Movie Awards.

Hegde's second film release, the Telugu film Oka Laila Kosam (2014), featured her opposite Naga Chaitanya. She was praised for her performance in the movie. Around the same time, she bagged the nomination for Best Actress at the 62nd Filmfare Awards (South). Following a production house and the success of the director Vijay Konda's previous venture, had prompted her to work on the project. She undertook Telugu lessons to help her portray the leading female role. In her second Telugu film, Hegde impressed many with her memorable performance in "Gopikamma" song from Mukunda (2014). It was a romantic-action tale, set in the backdrop of a village, released in late 2014.

In July 2014, Hegde agreed terms to make her Bollywood debut opposite Hrithik Roshan in Ashutosh Gowariker's period film Mohenjo Daro, set against the backdrop of the Indus Valley civilisation. She was selected after Gowariker's wife had spotted her in an advertisement and called her to audition, which she successfully completed. As a result of her commitment to the film, she revealed that she would take a break from appearing in regional Indian movies until her Hindi film's release and rejected an opportunity to work in a film directed by Mani Ratnam. Mohenjo Daro released in 2016. On her performance, Lisa Tsering of The Hollywood Reporter wrote she "brings a forgettable blandness to her sparsely sketched role." Writing for IndiaTimes, Shubha Shetty Saha wrote, "Pooja Hegde is pretty and makes quite a confident debut." and became major box office flop. In 2017, she appeared in Telugu-language vigilante action comedy film Duvvada Jagannadham alongside actor Allu Arjun. Writing for The Indian Express, Manoj Kumar R found that "Pooja Hegde has convincingly done the given job that is to look stunning in every frame of the film. Especially, she looks ravishing in all the song sequences." The film was successful in box office grossing over  crore.

Commercial success (2018–present) 
In 2018, Hegde featured in three Telugu films. The first is a special appearance in the song "Jigelu Rani" for the period action Rangasthalam. The song was trending in the YouTube and she was praised for her performance. Later in Saakshyam, alongside Bellamkonda Sreenivas and Trivikram Srinivas-directed action-drama Aravinda Sametha Veera Raghava, opposite Jr. NTR.The film received positive response and was a blockbuster. Haricharan Pudipeddi of News18 opined that "Pooja Hegde gets a meaty part and she deserves praise" for it. Writing for India Today, Janani K found "she has done a commendable job" in it. In 2019 too, she made an appearance in three films which are Maharshi, Gaddalakonda Ganesh and Housefull 4. Maharshi is a Telugu film directed by Vamsi Paidipally co-starring by Mahesh Babu. It received mixed reviews on release. The film was awarded the Best Popular Film Providing Wholesome Entertainment at the 68th National Film Awards. Her second Telugu film in the same year was the Harish Shankar-directed Gaddalakonda Ganesh, a remake of the 2014 Tamil-language film Jigarthanda, featuring Varun Tej and Atharvaa along with her. The film received positive reviews. Hegde returned to Bollywood after a gap of three years with Sajid Nadiadwala's comedy film Housefull 4 directed by Farhad Samji, featuring her as Rajkumari Mala and Pooja (reincarnated), which went on to gross over  crore worldwide.

Her 2020 Telugu-language action drama film Ala Vaikunthapurramuloo, alongside Allu Arjun and directed by Trivikram marks their collaboration with both Arjun and Trivikram, for the second time, after DJ: Duvvada Jagannadham (2017) and Aravinda Sametha Veera Raghava (2018). On her performance, a The Times of India critic wrote, "Pooja Hegde manages to bring in spunk into a character that is nothing more than a manic pixie dream girl, but she sure is a delight to watch on-screen." The film became third highest-grossing Telugu films of all time, grossing over  crore. Her performance fetched her several awards, including the SIIMA Award for Best Actress – Telugu. Hegde's dance performance in the song "Butta Bomma" received wide response.

In 2021, Hegde starred in Most Eligible Bachelor, directed by Bommarillu Bhaskar opposite Akhil Akkineni in which she played the role of a stand-up comedian. Her performance in the film received critical acclaim and won her the SIIMA Award for Best Actress – Telugu. In 2022, Hegde starred in the multilingual period romance film Radhe Shyam with Prabhas directed by Radha Krishna Kumar. Hegde's performance received positive reviews. The film's song "Aashiqui Aa Gayi" also gained more popularity among audiences with Hegde's grace and style being appreciated. Her second film in the same year was Tamil film Beast directed by Nelson, alongside Vijay. Released on 13 April, the film marked her return to Tamil cinema after a gap of 9 years. On her performance, Divya Nair of Rediff.com wrote, "Pooja Hegde looks pretty and does a decent job". Sowmya Rajendran of The News Minute opined "Pooja is gorgeous in 'Arabic Kuthu'". The film has worldwide collections of over  crore. Her next brief appearance was in the Koratala Siva-directed film Acharya alongside Chiranjeevi and Ram Charan. These three films were commercial failures. She performed her second dance number in the film, F3 alongside Venkatesh and Varun Tej in the party song "Life Ante Itta Vundaala".Her last release in 2022 was Hindi film Cirkus directed by Rohit Shetty where she played one of the female leads opposite Ranveer Singh. Writing for NDTV, Saibal Chatterjee said her performance to be "better". While Bollywood Hungama founded she "look stunning" and her performance as "okay" in it.

Upcoming projects 
She will star opposite Salman Khan in Kisi Ka Bhai Kisi Ki Jaan, directed by Farhad Samji, which is scheduled to release on 21 April 2023. In addition, she will appear in Trivikram Srinivas next film with Mahesh Babu tentatively titled #SSMB28. The film, which went on floors last week,  she will join the sets after Dussehra.

In the media 
Hegde is considered among the most popular actor of Telugu cinema. Hegde has frequently featured in The Times of India's listing of the "Most Desirable Woman" and the winner of the "Hyderabad Most Desirable women" of year 2017. Hegde is an active endorser for several brands and products. Hegde stood in the 7th place on Forbes India's Most Influential Stars on Instagram in South Cinema for the year 2021.

Filmography

Accolades

See also 

 List of Tamil film actresses
 List of Indian film actresses

References

External links 
 
 

Living people
Tulu people
21st-century Indian actresses
Indian beauty pageant winners
Actresses from Mumbai
Actresses in Telugu cinema
Indian film actresses
Actresses in Tamil cinema
Actresses in Hindi cinema
1990 births
Female models from Mumbai
South Indian International Movie Awards winners